Markua, also spelled, Markuwa is a village in Garautha tehsil, Jhansi district, Uttar Pradesh, India. The village is famous for a Hindu temple named Ramraja Sarkar. A temple of the same name also exists in Orchha, Madhya Pradesh.

Geography 

Other 
Markua has a Government junior high school, a primary health center, office and a godown of Seeds Corporation of India, a sub police station and a rest house of the Irrigation Department.

References 

Villages in Jhansi district